The 2022–23 Coupe de France preliminary rounds, Auvergne-Rhône-Alpes is the qualifying competition to decide which teams from the leagues of the Auvergne-Rhône-Alpes region of France take part in the main competition from the seventh round.

A total of nineteen teams will qualify from the Auvergne-Rhône-Alpes preliminary rounds.

In 2021–22, three teams progressed as far as the round of 64. Fifth tier Hauts Lyonnais were beaten by Ligue 2 side SC Bastia. Lyon La Duchère were eliminated by AS Saint-Étienne by a single goal. Andrézieux-Bouthéon FC also lost by a single goal to Ligue 1 opposition, Montpellier HSC.

Draws and fixtures
On 18 August 2022 the league confirmed that 921 teams had entered from the region, and published the final version of the first round draw, which originally featured 768 teams from Régional 3 and District divisions. However, one tie was never scheduled. The second round draw was published on 17 August 2022, with 102 teams entering the competition from the Régional 2 division.

The third round draw was published on 6 September 2022, and saw the 24 teams from Régional 1 and 11 teams from Championnat National 3 enter the competition. The fourth round draw, which saw the entry of the seven Championnat National 2 teams, was published on 13 September 2022.

The fifth and sixth rounds were drawn together, with the draw published on 27 September 2022. The three Championnat National teams entered at the fifth round stage.

First round
These matches were played on 27 and 28 August 2022.

Second round
These matches were played on 2, 3 and 4 September 2022, with one replayed on 10 September 2022.

Third round
These matches were played on 10, 11 and 18 September 2022.

Fourth round
These matches were played on 24 and 25 September 2022.

Fifth round
These matches were played on 8 and 9 October 2022, with one replayed on 22 October 2022.

Sixth round
These matches were played on 15, 16 and 29 October 2022.

References

Preliminary rounds